Six String Giant is a bootleg CD by Buckethead that includes two live shows: live at The Palace in Tokyo, Japan July 8, 1992, and live at The Electric Church in New York, New York, on April 27, 2000.

Track listing

Personnel
Buckethead – guitars, bass

External links
http://n3croville.blogspot.com/2009/04/buckethead-6-string-giant.html

Buckethead albums
Bootleg recordings